Emily Kaiser Wickersham (born April 26, 1984) is an American actress best known for her role as NCIS Special Agent Eleanor Bishop on NCIS.

Early life 
Wickersham has Austrian and Swedish (Värmland) ancestry. She was born in Kansas but grew up in Mamaroneck, New York. She attended Muhlenberg College for two years before dropping out.

Career 
In 2013, prior to the departure of actress Cote de Pablo, Wickersham was cast as NSA Analyst Eleanor "Ellie" Bishop in a three-episode arc on NCIS, starting November 19, 2013, on CBS. She was subsequently promoted to series regular, and her character officially became an NCIS Special Agent. Following the conclusion of the show's 18th season on May 26, 2021, Wickersham confirmed her departure from the show after eight years via Instagram.

Wickersham has also appeared in the feature film Gone and has made a number of guest appearances on television.

Personal life 
She married musician Blake Hanley on November 23, 2010, on Little Palm Island in the Florida Keys. They divorced in December 2018. She revealed she was expecting a baby boy with partner James Badge Dale on July 30, 2021, in an Instagram post. Wickersham's son Cassius Wickersham Dale was born on December 30, 2021.

Filmography

Film

Television

References

External links 

 

Living people
21st-century American actresses
American television actresses
Actresses from New York (state)
American people of Austrian descent
American people of Swedish descent
Mamaroneck High School alumni
People from Mamaroneck, New York
1984 births
Actresses from Kansas